Hans Baumgartner (born 30 May 1949 in Stühlingen, Baden-Württemberg) is a retired West German long jumper.

He won the silver medal at the 1972 Summer Olympics held in Munich with a jump of 8.18 meters. Baumgartner again took part in the 1976 Summer Olympics, but did not win a medal.  He also competed in the 1971 and 1974 European Championships, with the same result.

At the European Indoor Championships he won gold medals in 1971, 1973 and 1977 and silver medals in 1972 and 1974. He also won a bronze medal at the 1973 Summer Universiade and a silver medal at the 1977 IAAF World Cup. 8.18 metres remained his career best jump.

Hans Baumgartner competed for TV Heppenheim and trained under Hansjörg Holzamer. He became West German champion in 1980, 1971, 1972 and 1973. During his active career he measured 1.87 meters and weighed 75 kg.

References

1949 births
Living people
People from Waldshut (district)
Sportspeople from Freiburg (region)
West German male long jumpers
Olympic silver medalists for West Germany
Athletes (track and field) at the 1972 Summer Olympics
Athletes (track and field) at the 1976 Summer Olympics
Olympic athletes of West Germany
Medalists at the 1972 Summer Olympics
Olympic silver medalists in athletics (track and field)
Universiade medalists in athletics (track and field)
Universiade bronze medalists for West Germany
Medalists at the 1973 Summer Universiade